Paul Morrissey (born 1980) is an Irish retired hurler who played for Cork Senior Championship club Newtownshandrum. He usually lined out as a goalkeeper. Morrissey is also a former member of the Cork senior hurling team.

Career statistics

Inter-county

Honours

Newtownshandrum
All-Ireland Senior Club Hurling Championship (1): 2004
Munster Senior Club Hurling Championship (3): 2003, 2005, 2009
Cork Senior Hurling Championship (4): 2000, 2003, 2005, 2009
Cork Under-21 Hurling Championship (3): 1998, 1999, 2000

Cork
All-Ireland Senior Hurling Championship (2): 2004, 2005
Munster Senior Hurling Championship (2): 2003, 2005

References

1980 births
Living people
Newtownshandrum hurlers
Cork inter-county hurlers
Hurling goalkeepers